Zetaquirá is a town and municipality in the Colombian Lengupá Province, part of the department of Boyacá.

Etymology 
Zetaquirá in Chibcha means "Land of the snake" or "City of the snake".

History 
The central highlands of the Colombian Andes in the time before the Spanish conquest were inhabited by various indigenous peoples. The predominant culture was the Muisca, organized in a loose confederation. Zetaquirá was part of the reign of the zaque, based in Hunza, present-day Tunja. Other indigenous people in the vicinity of Zetaquirá were the Achagua and Tegua.

Modern Zetaquirá was not founded until May 21, 1765, by Pedro López.

Economy 
Main economical activities of Zetaquirá are agriculture and livestock farming. Predominant agricultural products are coffee, sugar cane, maize, bananas, beans and arracacha. Tourism, mainly the thermal baths in the municipality, is another source of income.

Gallery

References 

Municipalities of Boyacá Department
Populated places established in 1765
1765 establishments in the Spanish Empire
Muisca Confederation
Muysccubun